Justin Bostrom (born 20 March 1986 in Vadnais Heights, Minnesota) is an American professional ice hockey forward who plays for the Düsseldorfer EG in the German DEL.

Career
On 13 August 2009, he signed a one-year contract with GET-ligaen team Manglerud Star. On April 27, 2010, he signed for Lillehammer IK in the same league. In July 2012 he signed a try-out contract with Düsseldorfer EG in the German DEL.

References

External links

Manglerud Star profile

1986 births
Living people
American men's ice hockey forwards
Düsseldorfer EG players
Lillehammer IK players
Minnesota Golden Gophers men's ice hockey players
Sioux City Musketeers players
Ice hockey players from Minnesota
People from Vadnais Heights, Minnesota